Interstate Battery System of America, Inc., a.k.a. Interstate Batteries, is a US privately owned battery marketing and distribution company. It markets automotive batteries manufactured by Brookfield Business Partners, Exide Technologies, and others through independent distributors. The company is headquartered in Dallas, Texas, and it also markets marine/RV, mobility, motorcycle, lawn and garden, and other lines of batteries in the starting, lighting and ignition (SLI) markets. Interstate Batteries operates a distributor network that supplies batteries to over 200,000 dealers. They also have distributors in Bermuda, Bolivia, Canada, Costa Rica, the Dominican Republic, Guatemala, Guyana, Haiti, Honduras, Nicaragua and Panama. Additionally, they operate over 200 corporate and franchise owned retail stores.

History
In the spring of 1950, John Searcy began selling and delivering car batteries to wholesalers in the Dallas/Fort Worth area from the back of his red Studebaker pickup truck. After two years, Searcy founded his new company, naming it Interstate Battery System after the new interstate highway system being built across the U.S.

In 1978, John Searcy retired and left the company under the leadership of President and Chairman Norm Miller. Norm Miller continued the company's expansion so that by the 1980s Interstate Battery had distributorships in all 50 US states and Canada. During that time they also created the Interstate Batteries Great American Race, which for 13 years took vintage car owners and their vehicles on a two-week, cross-country rally. This led to other marketing schemes such as advertising on the Paul Harvey news radio show, running national TV commercials, and sponsoring champion.

In 1990, Norm's brother Tommy Miller became Interstate Battery's president and CEO while Norm remained chairman of the board. As a result, Interstate Battery became heavily involved in NASCAR. Interstate Battery became title sponsor of coach Joe Gibbs' new Winston Cup team in 1992 which eventually won the Winston Cup Championship in 2000. In March 2004, Carlos Sepulveda became president and CEO and went on to lead the company for almost a decade until leaving in 2013 to join Triumph Bancorp Group.

Norm Miller's son Scott became president and CEO in 2013.

Motorsports

Interstate Batteries currently sponsors NASCAR driver Ty Gibbs and the Joe Gibbs Racing team. Other notable drivers include Bobby Labonte, Dale Jarrett, Matt Kenseth (as standby driver in 1999 at Darlington and as main driver in 2017 at Daytona the Clash race) and J. J. Yeley. In 2010, the company began sponsoring NHRA Pro Stock driver Mike Edwards.

References

External links 
 

Companies based in Dallas
Auto parts suppliers of the United States